Lagoon Cove, British Columbia, Canada, is located between East and West Cracroft Islands in the Inside Passage between Vancouver Island and the North American mainland. There is a commercial marina located there serving pleasure boaters. It can be approached from Knight Inlet at Minstrel Island, or from Clio Channel, or from Chatham Channel via the "Blow Hole."

Gulf Islands